The composers in this list are those notable ones having Icelandic nationality, or whose main residence is Iceland. Icelandic names differ from most current Western family name systems by being patronymic (occasionally matronymic) in that they reflect the immediate father (or mother) of the child and not the historic family lineage.

This list is in alphabetical order according to the Icelandic alphabet.

A to D

E to K

L to R

S to Ö

References

Icelandic
Composers